EAS is the fourth studio album by Japanese rock band Fanatic Crisis and their first release with the label Stoic Stone on September 13, 2000. The original mixes of Purple & Psychic Honey, Sonzai Riyuu to Sonzai Ishiki, and Be You were featured on the Side Adam and Side Eve EPs.

Track listing

Personnel 
Tsutomu Ishizuki − vocals
Kazuya − lead guitar
Shun − rhythm guitar
Ryuji − bass
Tohru − drums

References

Fanatic Crisis albums
2000 albums